James Francis Heffernan (January 12, 1892 – December 21, 1938) was a Canadian hockey defenceman and coach. He played several years of senior hockey for amateur clubs before spending part of the 1919–20 season with the Toronto St. Patricks of the National Hockey League. He served as player-coach for part of the season before retiring from playing.

Playing career
From Peterborough, Ontario, Heffernan played junior hockey in his home town and then played at the senior level in Toronto with the Toronto Rugby and Athletic Association (TR&AA) club (1912 to 1914) and the Toronto Victorias (1914–15). He played in the United States from 1915 to 1918 with the Brooklyn Crescents and the New York Wanderers before returning to Canada and joining the senior amateur Toronto St. Patricks in the Ontario Hockey Association.

In December 1919, a group affiliated with the St. Pats took over the Toronto franchise in the National Hockey League, renaming the team the Toronto St. Patricks with Heffernan as player-coach and co-owner. The NHL credits Heffernan with coaching 12 games, with five wins and seven losses. He was replaced as coach during the season by Harvey Sproule, and sold his stake in the team in December 1920. The club would become the Toronto Maple Leafs in 1927. Heffernan was said to be joining the rival Canadian Hockey League, but it never got off the ground.

Heffernan was also a competitive football player with the TR&AA club, winning the Ontario Rugby Football Union senior championship. He died in 1938 in a New York City hotel room and is buried in St. Peter's Catholic Cemetery in his native Peterborough, Ontario.

Career statistics

Regular season and playoffs

Coaching record

External links
 

1892 births
1938 deaths
Canadian ice hockey coaches
Canadian ice hockey defencemen
Ice hockey people from Ontario
Ice hockey player-coaches
Ontario Hockey Association Senior A League (1890–1979) players
Sportspeople from Peterborough, Ontario
Toronto Maple Leafs coaches
Toronto St. Pats players